RFX may refer to:
Reversed-Field eXperiment, a reversed field pinch nuclear fusion device
The collective term for a request for information (RFI), request for proposal (RFP), or request for quotation (RFQ)
 J P Hunt Air Carriers (ICAO airline code: RFX) aka REFLEX, U.S. airline: see List of airline codes (J)
The regulatory factor X (RFX) gene and protein family:
 RFX1 gene and protein
 RFX2 gene and protein
 RFX3 gene and protein
 RFX4 gene and protein
 RFX5 gene and protein
 RFX6 gene and protein